Southfields is a district in the London Borough of Wandsworth. The following is a list of those people who were either born or live(d) in Southfields, or had some important contribution to make to the district.

 Mirza Masroor Ahmad - the elected spiritual leader of the worldwide Ahmadiyya Muslim Community
 John Creasey - English author
 Peter Duncan - British actor and television presenter, Blue Peter
 George Eliot - novelist, wrote The Mill on the Floss while living in Wimbledon Park Road
 George Entwistle - former Director-General of the BBC
 Phillip Glasier - expert on hawking and falconry, born in Southfields
 Will Greenwood - rugby player with Harlequins and England
 Andy Hamilton - scriptwriter of TV show Drop the Dead Donkey
 Alan Hudson - Chelsea and England footballer
 Ralph Ineson - actor
 Tom Mann - trade unionist and leader of the London Dock strike of 1889
 Michael Meacher - Labour MP and former Minister
 Paul Merton - comedian, panelist for BBC's Have I Got News for You
 Jason Rebello - jazz pianist
 Paul Reedy - Australian rower and coach with British Rowing
 Eleanor Roosevelt - civil and human rights activist responsible for the adoption of the Universal Declaration of Human Rights, attended Allenswood Academy 1899-1902
 Simon Rose - journalist and broadcaster
Dan Smith - member of indie/techno band Bastille
 Marie Souvestre - feminist educator, founder of Allenswood Academy and formative influence on Eleanor Roosevelt
 Jimmy White - English snooker player, six times World Championship finalist

References

People from the London Borough of Wandsworth
Southfields